Andrea Segre (born 6 September 1976) is an Italian film director. He directed more than ten films since 2004.

Filmography
Fiction
 2007 La mal'ombra
 2009 Magari le cose cambiano
 2011 Shun Li and the Poet
 2013 First Snowfall
 2017 The Order of Things

Documentaries
 2004 Dio era un musicista
 2006 Checosamanca
 2008 Come un uomo sulla terra
 2010 Il Sangue verde
 2012 Mare chiuso
 2013 Rebetiko Crisis: Undue Debt
 2014 Come il peso dell'acqua
 2015 I sogni del lago salato
 2017 Ibi
 2021 Venetian Molecules (Molecole)

References

External links 

1976 births
Living people
Italian film directors
Film people from the Metropolitan City of Venice
People from Dolo